is a central idea in Japanese culture, meaning to acknowledge one's own mistake and to pledge improvement. This is similar to the German proverb Selbsterkenntnis ist der erste Schritt zur Besserung, where the closest translation to English would be "Insight into oneself is the first step to improvement".

Cultural meaning
In the hansei process, the emphasis is on what went wrong and on creating clear plans for ensuring that it does not reoccur; this is done constantly and consistently. At Toyota, even if one completes a project successfully, there is still a hansei-kai (reflection meeting) to review what went wrong. If a manager or engineer claims that there were not any problems with the project, they will be reminded that “no problem is a problem” – meaning that one has not objectively and critically evaluated the project to find opportunities for improvement. No problems indicate that one did not stretch to meet (or exceed) their expected capacity.

Cultural examples
An example would be the actions of Japanese politicians involved in corruption. They apologize publicly for the inappropriate action, then remove themselves from public politics for a few years. They resume their career after a culturally accepted period of time where they learned their lesson.

In Japanese companies it is common practice for a manager to expect hansei from his subordinates in case of mistakes. The manager will publicly take the blame, while the department works on solving the problem.

Other use  
Hansei also incorporates the concept of greeting success with modesty and humility. To stop hansei means to stop learning. With hansei, one never becomes convinced of one's own superiority, and feels that there is always more room, or need, for further improvement.

See also
Self-criticism

References

External links 
 Summary at Superfactory
 Hansei at Toyota

Japanese words and phrases
Japanese culture
Society of Japan
Japanese values